Mark Francis Janssens (born May 19, 1968) is a Canadian former professional ice hockey forward.

Janssens started his National Hockey League career with the New York Rangers in 1989.  He also played for the Minnesota North Stars, Hartford Whalers, Mighty Ducks of Anaheim, New York Islanders, Phoenix Coyotes, and Chicago Blackhawks.  He left the NHL after the 2001 season.

On September 11, 2001, Janssens was heading to Columbia University and saw one of the planes hit the World Trade Center.

Currently employed at Access Global Trading based out of Stamford, Connecticut.

Career statistics

Regular season and playoffs

References

External links

1968 births
Living people
Binghamton Rangers players
Canadian expatriate ice hockey players in the United States
Canadian ice hockey centres
Chicago Blackhawks players
Colorado Rangers players
Denver Rangers players
Hartford Whalers players
Houston Aeros (1994–2013) players
Ice hockey people from British Columbia
Kalamazoo Wings (1974–2000) players
Mighty Ducks of Anaheim players
Minnesota North Stars players
New York Islanders players
New York Rangers draft picks
New York Rangers players
Norfolk Admirals players
Phoenix Coyotes players
Regina Pats players
Sportspeople from Surrey, British Columbia